Bocula sejuncta is a moth of the family Erebidae first described by Francis Walker in 1856. It is found in the Indian subregion, Borneo, Sumbawa, Sulawesi, New Guinea and Queensland.

The larvae feed on Pongamia species. It lives on the underside of the leaves, skeletonising them from the edges.

References

Rivulinae